"Leave It Alone" is a song written by James Mercer and Brian Burton of the American alternative rock band Broken Bells. It was originally recorded by the band for their second studio album, After the Disco, where it appears as the fourth track on the album. A "Leave It Alone" promotional single was released for streaming on the Australian branch of commercial music streaming service Spotify on February 4, 2014, becoming the fourth release by the band in promotion of After the Disco, after singles "Holding on for Life", "After the Disco" and promotional single "Perfect World". The song can be found in the soundtrack of the movie Miss You Already starring Toni Collette and Drew Barrymore. The song is a playable track in the music video game Guitar Hero Live.

Music video
No music video for "Leave It Alone" is known to be in production. However, a lyric video, reflecting the art style of the After the Disco short film series and featuring the band's "signature pink aesthetic", was premiered on music video hosting service Vevo on February 4, 2014, the day of After the Disco'''s release in the United States.

Track listing

Personnel
Adapted from After the Disco'' liner notes.

Broken Bells
Brian Burton – drums, organ, piano, synthesizer, percussion, bass, guitar
James Mercer – Vocals, guitar, bass, organ, synthesizer, percussion

Vocals
Elizabeth Berg – backing vocals
Heather Porcaro – backing vocals
Myla Balugay – backing vocals
Rebecca Ann Stark – backing vocals

Technical personnel
Brian Burton – production, programming
Kennie Takahashi – programming, mixing, recording, engineering
Todd Monfalcone – recording
Jeff Peters – recording [strings]
Jacob Dennis – assistant mixing, assistant engineering
Michele Harrison – management
Chris Kahn – assistant mixing, assistant engineering
Stephen Marcussen – mastering
Todd Monfalcone – mixing, second engineer
Ian Montone – management
Geoff Neal – assistant mixing
Amy Schmalz – management
Laura Sisk – second engineer
Jeremy Underwood – assistant engineer [strings]

The Angel City String Orchestra
Daniele Luppi – conductor, string arrangement
Anton Riehl – score
Peter Kent – concertmaster, violin
Chris Tedesco – contractor
Carolyn Osborn – violin
Erika Walczak – violin
Jennifer Walton – violin
Judy Yoo – violin
Julie Beavers – violin
Norman Hughes – violin
Shari Zippert – violin
Sharon Jackson – violin
Susan Chatman – violin
Vladimir Polimatidi – violin
Alisha Bauer – cello
Stefanie Fife – cello
Vanessa Freebairn-Smith – cello
Adrianna Zoppo – viola
Brianna Bandy – viola
Jessica Van Velzen – viola

Release history

References

2014 singles
Broken Bells songs
2014 songs
Columbia Records singles
Songs written by Danger Mouse (musician)
Songs written by James Mercer (musician)
Song recordings produced by Danger Mouse (musician)